Corellidae is a family of sea squirts belonging to the suborder Phlebobranchia.

Genera
The World Register of Marine Species includes the following genera in this family:

Abyssascidia Herdman, 1880
Chelyosoma Broderip & Sowerby, 1830
Clatripes Monniot F. & Monniot C., 1976
Corella Alder & Hancock, 1870
Corelloides Oka, 1926
Corellopsis Hartmeyer, 1903
Corynascidia Herdman, 1882
Dextrogaster Monniot F., 1962
Mysterascidia Monniot C. & Monniot F., 1982
Rhodosoma Ehrenberg, 1828
Xenobranchion Ärnbäck-Christie-Linde, 1950

References

Enterogona
Tunicate families